Tambun biscuits (Tâi-lô: Tām-būn-piánn) are a miniaturised form of Tau Sar Pneah (Tâi-lô: Tāu-sá-piánn), both famous Penang delicacies made from wheat flour, sugar, green bean paste, fried onions, lard and salt. The pastry was believed to be invented in Bukit Tambun, Penang. Its popularity as a delicacy has made this biscuit one of the must-buy souvenirs from Penang.

Some bakeries call them dragon balls, a nickname coined by locals.

The biscuits are sweet and salty, from the sweet crust and the salty filling.

Gallery

References 

Malaysian cuisine
Penang